Machaonia is a genus of flowering plants in the family Rubiaceae. It has about 32 species. All are indigenous to the neotropics. None has a unique common name. Some species have been called "alfilerillo", a Spanish name for the common and well-known genus Erodium. The type species for Machaonia is Machaonia acuminata.

Machaonia was named by Humboldt and Bonpland in 1806 in their book, Plantae Aequinoctiales. This genus name is for Machaon, the son of Asclepias in Greek Mythology.

Phylogenetic studies of DNA sequences have shown that Machaonia is paraphyletic over Neoblakea and Allenanthus.

Species
The following species list may be incomplete or contain synonyms.

References

External links
 Machaonia At: Search Page At: World Checklist of Rubiaceae At: Index by Team At: Projects At: Science Directory At: Scientific Research and Data At: Kew Gardens
 Machaonia At:Index Nominum Genericorum At: References At: NMNH Department of Botany At: Research and Collections At: Smithsonian National Museum of Natural History
 Machaonia At: Plant Names At: IPNI
 Machaonia In Volume 1 Of: Voyage de Humboldt et Bonpland Sixieme Partie Botanique Plantes Équinoxiales At: Titles At: Biodiversity Heritage Library
 Machaonia At: List of Genera At: Rubiaceae At: List of families At: Families and Genera in GRIN At: Queries At: GRIN taxonomy for plants
 Machaonia portoricensis At:Wildland Shrubs At: International Institute of Tropical Forestry At: International At: U.S. Forest Service

 
Rubiaceae genera
Taxa named by Aimé Bonpland
Taxa named by Alexander von Humboldt
Taxonomy articles created by Polbot